"Blue Feather" is a popular song written in 1909 with music by Theodore F. Morse and lyrics by Jack Mahoney. In the song the singer is expressing his love for sweet Blue Feather. The chorus is:

References

Bibliography
Mahoney, Jack. (w.); Morse, Theodore F. (m.). "Blue Feather" (Sheet music). New York: Theodore Morse Music Co. (1909).

External links
"Blue Feather", Ada Jones & Billy Murray (Edison Standard 10162, 1909)—Cylinder Preservation and Digitization Project.

1909 songs
Songs with music by Theodore F. Morse